Robert Anthony Beckett (born 2 January 1986) is an English comedian, narrator, and presenter. He was a co-host on the ITV2 spin-off show I'm a Celebrity...Get Me Out of Here! NOW! from 2012 to 2014. Since 2016, Beckett has been a team captain on the E4 panel show 8 Out of 10 Cats and the narrator of the reality series Celebs Go Dating. He presents BBC One entertainment series Wedding Day Winners and All Together Now.

Early life
Beckett was born on 2 January 1986 in Mottingham, London. His father (nicknamed "Super Dave") was a driver of, throughout his career, vans, lorries, oil tankers, and cabs. He calls his mother, who was a homemaker throughout his childhood and later worked in a shop, "Big Suze." He has four brothers. 

He went to Edgebury Primary School and then Coopers School in Chislehurst.

He attended Canterbury Christ Church University in Kent from 2004 to 2007, where he studied Tourism Management.

Career
Beckett started performing stand-up in 2009. His performances lead to a third place in So You Think You're Funny, and winning the Amused Moose Laugh-Off which earned him an invitation to perform at the Adelaide Fringe Festival in Australia. In Adelaide, Beckett was nominated for the best newcomer award in 2011. He made his debut at the Edinburgh Fringe Festival in 2012 with his solo show "Rob Beckett's Summer Holiday".

In 2011, Beckett made a guest appearance as Mike in the Channel 4 series Fresh Meat.

From 2012 until 2014, Beckett co-hosted I'm a Celebrity...Get Me Out of Here! NOW!, the ITV2 spin-off from the main show. He presented the show with Laura Whitmore and Joe Swash. He announced his departure from the show in October 2015, to concentrate on his tour. He was replaced by David Morgan.

Beckett also presented the Rock'N'Roll Football Sunday show on Absolute Radio from August 2014 until 2018.

Alongside fellow comedian Ian Smith and former footballer Jimmy Bullard, Beckett hosts UK television channel Dave's comedy-football podcast The Magic Sponge; an irreverent look at the lives of professional footballers.

Beckett narrated the 2016 E4 series Celebs Go Dating. In February 2017, the second series of Celebs Go Dating began airing with him writing and narrating once again, this time with some overseas celebrities in tow.  Since 2016, Beckett has been a team captain on the More4 panel show 8 Out of 10 Cats.

Beckett was a contestant and eventual winner on the third series of Taskmaster, which aired in October 2016. In 2018, he presented Wedding Day Winners, with Lorraine Kelly, and All Together Now, with Geri Halliwell, both Saturday-night entertainment series for BBC One. The following year, in 2019, Beckett started presenting a Sky TV series Rob & Romesh vs... where he and fellow comic and presenter Romesh Ranganathan travel around the world, delve into the lives and careers of celebrities and take on various challenges.

As of April 2020, Beckett has co-hosted a podcast named Lockdown Parenting Hell, with fellow comedian Josh Widdicombe. The pair frequently interview celebrities regarding the difficulties of parenting during the Coronavirus lockdown.

On 20 February 2022, Beckett started his new 5-7pm Sunday Show on BBC Radio 2, a timeslot he shared throughout the year with Paul O'Grady on the Wireless.

Personal life
Beckett married Louise "Lou" Watts, a teacher, in 2015. The couple has two daughters.

Beckett is a supporter of Arsenal and Bromley

Filmography

Television

Film

References

External links

Rob Beckett (BBC Radio 2)

1986 births
Living people
21st-century English comedians
BBC Radio 2 presenters
Comedians from London
Comic Relief people
English male comedians
People from Mottingham